Drying Up the Streets is a 1978 Canadian feature from Robin Spry produced by the Canadian Broadcasting Corporation.

Synopsis
This film was originally planned as a one-hour drama for the CBC's For the Record, series but was expanded into a feature while it was being shot cinéma vérité-style on the streets of Toronto between October 11 and October 27, 1977. It concerns the search for a runaway (Laurie Brown) by her father (Don Francks), an aging hippy who is coerced to do so by a member of the RCMP drug squad (Len Cariou). Exploring the darker side of the ‘flower power’ generation, Drying Up the Streets mixes documentary realism with stylized set pieces.

It's one of director Robin Spry’s finest films; however, it never received theatrical distribution and was eventually aired on the CBC in 1979 to good notices.

Awards and nominations

References

External links

1978 films
Canadian drama television films
English-language Canadian films
Films directed by Robin Spry
CBC Television original films
Films shot in Toronto
1970s Canadian films